Bellamack is a suburb of Palmerston. It is 26.5 km southeast of the Darwin CBD. Its local government area is the City of Palmerston.

References

External links
 https://web.archive.org/web/20080123190745/http://www.nt.gov.au/lands/lis/placenames/origins/greaterdarwin.shtml#b
 https://web.archive.org/web/20091005152315/http://nt.gov.au/lands/lru/buildingpalmerston/bellamack/index.shtml
 http://www.ntnews.com.au/article/2009/11/05/98601_realestate.html

Suburbs of Darwin, Northern Territory